Roberto García-Calvo Montiel (La Bañeza, 1942 - Villaviciosa de Odón, 2008) was a Spanish judge. Since 2001 he has been a member of the Constitutional Court of Spain, sponsored by the conservative People's Party. In the last year of the Francoist State, García-Calvo served as a local official repressing workers strikes. During his serving in the highest court, he has been considered as part of the persistence of the shadow of Francoism in the Spanish institutions. He died by natural causes on May 17, 2008 at aged 65 in Villaviciosa de Odón, Madrid.

References

External links
 3cat24.cat - Obituary 
ElPaís.com - Obituary 

1942 births
2008 deaths
People from La Bañeza
20th-century Spanish judges
21st-century Spanish judges